Planet Colors is the seventh studio album by Swiss singer DJ BoBo, released in 2001. Three singles were released from the album during the same year: "What a Feeling", "Hard to Say I'm Sorry" and "Colors of Life".

The first single from the album, "What a Feeling", features American singer Irene Cara and is a cover version of her 1983 song "Flashdance... What a Feeling". It was chosen to be on the album in an online poll on DJ BoBo's official website in May 2000, in which fans were asked which successful 1980s song they would like to be covered for his new album. The single reached No. 2 in Switzerland and No. 3 in Germany. The other two singles failed to enter the top ten in both countries.

Track listing

 "Let the Party Begin" – 4:03
 "What a Feeling" (with Irene Cara) – 3:46
 "Hard to Say I'm Sorry" – 3:57
 "Man in the Mirror" – 4:51
 "Colors of Life" – 4:03
 "Moscow" – 4:15
 "Say It Again" – 3:54
 "Top of the World" – 4:20
 "Way to Your Heart" – 3:50
 "Tell Me Why" – 3:41
 "Dreaming of You" – 4:13
 "Time to Turn Off the Light" – 4:44

Charts

Weekly charts

Year-end charts

External links
Discogs

References

2001 albums
DJ BoBo albums